Viktor Iosifovich Bursuk (born 9 April 1958) is a retired officer of the Russian Navy. He currently holds the rank of vice-admiral, and was a deputy commander-in-chief of the navy.

References

Living people
Russian vice admirals
1958 births
Military personnel from Donetsk
Recipients of the Order of Military Merit (Russia)
Recipients of the Order of Naval Merit (Russia)
State Prize of the Russian Federation laureates
Military Academy of the General Staff of the Armed Forces of Russia alumni
N. G. Kuznetsov Naval Academy alumni